Anatoli Vasilyevich Ivanov (June 26, 1934 – April 2, 2012) was a Russian solo-timpanist, percussionist with the Saint Petersburg Philharmonic Orchestra, book author and People's Artist of Russia (1997). President of the Russian Association of Percussion Performers, member of the Percussive Arts Society, conductor, member of the Russian Authors Society. He taught at the Leningrad Conservatory. A tribute concert was held on at Mariinsky Theatre on 12 April 2016.

References

Classical percussionists
1934 births
2012 deaths
Russian composers
People's Artists of Russia
Russian conductors (music)
Russian male conductors (music)
Burials at the Vienna Central Cemetery
Soviet conductors (music)
Soviet pianists
Russian pianists
Soviet composers
Russian drummers
Soviet music educators
Academic staff of Saint Petersburg Conservatory
Russian classical musicians
Saint Petersburg Conservatory alumni
20th-century Russian male musicians